Oleg Vyacheslavovich Smirnov (born April 8, 1980) is a Russian professional ice hockey right winger currently playing for HC Ryazan in the Russian Major League. He played in the Russian Superleague for Kristall Elektrostal, HC Lipetsk, HC Spartak Moscow, HC Dynamo Moscow, HC CSKA Moscow and Metallurg Novokuznetsk. He was drafted 144th overall in the 1998 NHL Entry Draft by the Edmonton Oilers.

External links

1980 births
Living people
Edmonton Oilers draft picks
HC CSKA Moscow players
HC Dynamo Moscow players
HC Vityaz players
HC Spartak Moscow players
Metallurg Novokuznetsk players
People from Pavlovo-Posadsky District
Russian ice hockey left wingers
Sportspeople from Moscow Oblast